Rogachyovsky Uyezd (Рогачёвский уезд) was one of the subdivisions of the Mogilev Governorate of the Russian Empire. It was situated in the southern part of the governorate. Its administrative centre was Rahachow.

Demographics
At the time of the Russian Empire Census of 1897, Rogachyovsky Uyezd had a population of 224,652. Of these, 86.9% spoke Belarusian, 9.7% Yiddish, 2.0% Russian, 1.1% Polish, 0.1% Ukrainian and 0.1% German as their native language.

References

 
Uezds of Mogilev Governorate
Mogilev Governorate